Al-Amryain is a sub-district located in As Sawd District, 'Amran Governorate, Yemen. Al-Amryain had a population of 1596 according to the 2004 census.

References 

Sub-districts in As Sawd District